Deunta Williams (born November 21, 1987) is a former American football defensive back. He played football for the University of North Carolina. Williams was considered one of the top safety prospects in his class.

High school career
A native of Jacksonville, North Carolina, Williams attended White Oak High School, where he starred at wide receiver and defensive back. Deunta also saw time as a running back and quarterback in his high school career.  As a senior, he caught 29 passes
for 299 yards on offense and averaged eight tackles per game and intercepted seven passes on defense, while as a junior, he had 400 yards receiving, 250 yards rushing and 200 yards passing. He received All-American honors by SuperPrep and was named the defensive MVP for the North Carolina team in the Shrine Bowl.

Considered a four-star recruit by Rivals.com, Williams was listed as the No. 25 athlete in the nation in 2006.

College career
After redshirting his initial season at North Carolina, Williams switched from wide receiver to safety in the fall of 2007, prior to the start of the season. He started all 12 games and ranked fifth on the team with 59 tackles. Williams was an FWAA and Rivals.com Freshman All-American in 2007.

As a sophomore, Williams started all 13 games and ranked fifth on the team with 65 tackles, including 55 solo stops. He also had three interceptions, three pass breakups and one forced fumble.

In 2010 during the Franklin Mortgage American Music City Bowl. Williams suffered a career ending injury to his leg.

Professional career
Williams went undrafted in the 2011 NFL Draft.

References

External links
North Carolina Tar Heels profile

1987 births
Living people
People from Jacksonville, North Carolina
American football safeties
North Carolina Tar Heels football players